Desbarats Strait is a natural waterway through the central Canadian Arctic Archipelago in the territory of Nunavut. It separates the Findlay Group of islands (to the north) from Cameron Island (to the south).

References 

Straits of Qikiqtaaluk Region